The Binney & Burnham was an American automobile built in Boston from 1901 to 1902 by James L. Binney and John Appleton Burnham.  It was a twin-cylinder steam car.

References
David Burgess Wise, The New Illustrated Encyclopedia of Automobiles.

Defunct motor vehicle manufacturers of the United States
Steam cars
Motor vehicle manufacturers based in Massachusetts